Jomoro may refer to:

 Jomoro (Ghana parliament constituency), a parliament constituency in Ghana
 Jomoro Municipal District, a local government district in Ghana
 Jomoro, a musical duo composed of Joey Waronker and Mauro Refosco